Schefflera alongensis is a flowering plant in the family Araliaceae. It is endemic to Vietnam.

References 

alongensis
Flora of Bolivia